The Women's team sabre event of the 2017 World Fencing Championships was held on 25 July 2017.

Draw

Championship bracket

5–8th place bracket

9–16th place bracket

13–16th place bracket

Final ranking

References
Bracket

2017 World Fencing Championships
World